Arthur John Lovett Darby (9 January 1876 in Chester – 15 January 1960 in Dartmouth, Devon) was a British rugby union player who competed in the 1900 Summer Olympics.

Before representing Britain in the Olympics, Darby was selected to represent England as part of the 1899 Home Nations Championship while playing club rugby for Cambridge University. Darby played only one game for England in a period viewed as very poor for the national team. The next year Darby played for the British rugby union team, which won the silver medal.

References

External links

1876 births
1960 deaths
Cambridge University R.U.F.C. players
English rugby union players
England international rugby union players
Rugby union players at the 1900 Summer Olympics
Olympic rugby union players of Great Britain
Olympic silver medallists for Great Britain
Medalists at the 1900 Summer Olympics
Rugby union players from Chester